Paulo Martins may refer to:
 Paulo Martins (wrestler) (born 1970), Portuguese wrestler
 Paulo Eduardo Martins (born 1981), Portuguese politician
 Paulo Martins (footballer) (born 1991), East Timorese footballer

See also
 Paul Martin (disambiguation)